Gofa may refer to:

Gofa people of Ethiopia
Gofa language
Gofa Zone, named after them

Language and nationality disambiguation pages